Charles Wesley Weldon,  (February 27, 1830 – January 12, 1896) was a Canadian lawyer and politician. He represented the City and County of St. John in the House of Commons of Canada from 1878 to 1891 as a Liberal member.

He was born in Richibucto, New Brunswick, the son of John Wesley Weldon and Frances Chandler Upham. He was educated at King's College in Windsor, Nova Scotia. He studied law in his father's office, was called to the bar in 1851 and set up practice in Saint John. In 1860, he married Annie Tucker. He was originally opposed to Confederation. In 1873, he was named Queen's Counsel. Weldon was defeated in the 1891 general election.

Electoral record

References 
The Canadian biographical dictionary and portrait gallery of eminent and self-made men ... (1881)

1830 births
1896 deaths
Lawyers in New Brunswick
Canadian King's Counsel
Members of the House of Commons of Canada from New Brunswick
Liberal Party of Canada MPs